Swink is a Statutory Town in Otero County, Colorado, United States.  The population was 677 at the 2010 census.

A post office called Swink has been in operation since 1906. The community was named after George W. Swink, a Colorado politician.

Demographics

As of the census of 2000, there were 696 people, 278 households, and 199 families residing in the town. The racial makeup of the town was 88.79% White, 0.43% African American, 1.01% Native American, 0.86% Asian, 7.18% from other races, and 1.72% from two or more races. Hispanic or Latino of any race were 20.55% of the population.

There were 278 households, out of which 34.5% had children under the age of 18 living with them, 60.1% were married couples living together, 8.3% had a female householder with no husband present, and 28.1% were non-families. 25.9% of all households were made up of individuals, and 15.8% had someone living alone who was 65 years of age or older.  The average household size was 2.48 and the average family size was 2.99.

In the town, the population was spread out, with 26.7% under the age of 18, 6.3% from 18 to 24, 26.4% from 25 to 44, 24.9% from 45 to 64, and 15.7% who were 65 years of age or older.  The median age was 39 years. For every 100 females, there were 98.9 males.  For every 100 females age 18 and over, there were 96.2 males.

The median income for a household in the town was $36,094, and the median income for a family was $46,667. Males had a median income of $36,806 versus $25,694 for females. The per capita income for the town was $19,353.  About 8.4% of families and 10.8% of the population were below the poverty line, including 9.6% of those under age 18 and 13.3% of those age 65 or over.

Transportation
Swink has been incorporated in Colorado's Bustang network. It is part of the Lamar-Pueblo-Colorado Springs line.

See also

 List of municipalities in Colorado

References

External links

 Town of Swink contacts
 CDOT map of the Town of Swink

Towns in Otero County, Colorado
Towns in Colorado